West Yard Works was the Taff Vale Railway's locomotive repair and construction factory.  It was located in Cardiff between Bute Street and the Glamorganshire Canal, about 100 metres west of Bute Dock railway station (which is now Cardiff Bay railway station).

A small engine shed with room for one locomotive and a repair shop was built there when the railway was first constructed in 1839, but much of the work had to be carried out in the open air.

In 1846 Henry Clement was appointed as the railway's Resident Engineer and one of the first things he did was to have a locomotive works built there.  In 1857 the first locomotive was built at the works, 'Venus' a small 2-4-0 passenger loco.

When the Taff Vale introduced the 0-6-2T type, which was to become ubiquitous across South Wales, the works traverser could not accommodate the longer wheelbase so locomotives had to have their trailing radial wheels removed while within the works.

The works could only be accessed by level crossings accessed by turntables on the main line near the railway's terminus at Bute Road station.

Shortage of space finally led Tom Hurry Riches, the railway's Locomotive Superintendent to suspend locomotive building by the company itself after the completion of the O1 class in 1897.  However in 1903 a  small steam engine unit for the company's first rail motor was built there, the carriage part being built at their Cathays Carriage and Wagon Works, however further rail motors were all built by outside contractors.

After the Great War there were plans to build a new works at Radyr but as the company was to amalgamate with the Great Western Railway and other South Wales companies in 1922 that plan was abandoned and the Great Western subsequently concentrated all major locomotive repair work in South Wales at the former Rhymney Railway's Caerphilly Works.

New workshops were constructed at Caerphilly and after their opening West Yard Works finally closed on 28 August 1926, the remaining workforce transferring to Caerphilly.

One locomotive built at West Yard has survived, as the last standard gauge loco built in Wales.  No 28, an O1 class 0-6-2T is now a part of the National Collection, currently under restoration at the Gwili Railway.

References

Taff Vale Railway
Railway workshops in Great Britain
Butetown